Yasaiyan Station is an underground metro station in Ningbo, Zhejiang, China. Yasaiyan Station situates on the crossing of Qingyun Rnad and Gaojie Road. Construction of the station started in December 2010 and the station opened to service on September 26, 2015.

Exits 
Yasaiyan Station has 6 exits.

References 

Railway stations in Zhejiang
Railway stations in China opened in 2015
Ningbo Rail Transit stations